Package may refer to:

Containers or Enclosures
 Packaging and labeling, enclosing or protecting products
 Mail, items larger than a letter
 Chip package or chip carrier
 Electronic packaging, in electrical engineering
 Automotive package, in automobile production and marketing
 Package holiday, in tourism

Computing
 Modular programming, a software component
 Java package, a mechanism for organizing Java classes
 Package (package management system), a file used by a package management system to install an application or library
 Package (macOS), a directory hierarchy normally treated as a single object in the Finder in macOS
 Package (UML) in the context of UML, which is used to groups elements
 Package format, a type of archive containing computer programs and additional metadata

Entertainment and sports
 Movie packaging, in which a talent agency bundles its clients with a film or TV project
 The Package (1989 film), a 1989 American political thriller film starring Gene Hackman
 The Package (2013 film), a 2013 American action film starring Steve Austin and Dolph Lundgren
 The Package (Seinfeld), an episode of the TV show Seinfeld
 "The Package" (short story), a 1952 short story by Kurt Vonnegut
 The Package (2018 film), an American black comedy film
 The Package (TV series)
 The Package (Lost), the tenth television episode the television series Lost
 Formation (American football), sometimes referred to as "packages" rather than "formations"
 Personnel grouping (gridiron football), often called a "(personnel) package", a numeric code denoting the specific offensive skill position players used for a play

See also
 Pack (disambiguation)
 Package film (disambiguation)
 Package unit (disambiguation)
 Packager (disambiguation)
 Packaging (disambiguation)
 Packet (disambiguation)
 PKG (disambiguation)
 Software package (disambiguation)
 Stimulus Package (disambiguation)
 Surprise Package (disambiguation)
 The Package (disambiguation)